Polina Knoroz (born 20 July 1999 in Saint Petersburg, Russia) is a Russian pole vaulter and athlete. She started her career in 2014, when she was at school.

Biography 
Polina Knoroz was born on 20 July 1999 in Saint Petersburg, Russia. By profession, she is a Russian pole vaulter and athlete who competes internationally for Russia. In 2020 she participated at the Russian Indoor Athletic Championship and won the silver medal with a vault of 4.65m.  Her best vault of 2021 was 4.65 in Znamenskikh stadium, Moscow.

Progression 

 Pole vault outdoor

References 

Russian female pole vaulters
1999 births
Living people
Athletes from Saint Petersburg